In Our Nature is the thirteenth studio album released by Canadian country rock band Blue Rodeo, released on October 29, 2013. The album was entirely recorded in Greg Keelor's farm house just outside Peterborough, Ontario.

Track listing
All songs written by Greg Keelor and Jim Cuddy, unless otherwise noted.
 "New Morning Sun"
 "Wondering"
 "Over Me"
 "Never Too Late"
 "When The Truth Comes Out"
 "Paradise"
 "Tell Me Again"
 "Mattawa"
 "Made Your Mind Up"
 "In Our Nature" (Keelor/Cuddy/Damian Rogers)
 "In The Darkness" (Keelor/Cuddy/Margaret Good)	
 "You Should Know" 	
 "Tara’s Blues"
 "Out Of The Blue" (Robbie Robertson)

Chart performance

Certifications

References

Blue Rodeo albums
2013 albums